The Goodyear Tire & Rubber Company is an American multinational tire manufacturing company founded in 1898 by Frank Seiberling and based in Akron, Ohio. Goodyear manufactures tires for passenger vehicles, aviation, commercial trucks, military and police  vehicles, motorcycles, RVs, race cars, and heavy off-road machinery. It also makes bicycle tires, having returned from a break in production between 1976 and 2015. As of 2017, Goodyear is one of the top five tire manufacturers along with Bridgestone (Japan), Michelin (France), Continental (Germany) and MRF (India).

The company was named after American Charles Goodyear (1800–1860), inventor of vulcanized rubber. The first Goodyear tires became popular because they were easily detachable and required little maintenance.

Though Goodyear had been manufacturing airships and balloons since the early 1900s, the first Goodyear advertising blimp flew in 1925. Today, it is one of the most recognizable advertising icons in America. The company is  the sole tire supplier for NASCAR series and the most successful tire supplier in Formula One history, with more starts, wins, and constructors' championships than any other tire supplier. They pulled out of the sport after the 1998 season.

Goodyear was the first global tire manufacturer to enter China when it invested in a tire manufacturing plant in Dalian in 1994.

Goodyear was a component of the Dow Jones Industrial Average between 1930 and 1999. The company opened a new global headquarters building in Akron in 2013.

History

Early history 1898–1926
The first Goodyear factory opened in Akron, Ohio, in 1898. The company originally manufactured bicycle and carriage tires, rubber horseshoe pads, and poker chips, and grew with the advent of the automobile.

In 1901, Goodyear founder Frank Seiberling provided Henry Ford with racing tires. In 1903, Goodyear president, chairman and CEO Paul Weeks Litchfield was granted a patent for the first tubeless automobile tire.

In 1916, Litchfield found land in the Phoenix area suitable for growing long-staple cotton, which was needed to reinforce its rubber in tires. The 36,000 acres purchased were controlled by the Southwest Cotton Company, formed with Litchfield as president. (This included land that would develop into the towns of Goodyear and Litchfield Park.)

In 1924, Litchfield forged a joint venture with the German Luftschiffbau Zeppelin Company to form the Goodyear-Zeppelin Corporation. From the late 1920s to 1940, the company worked with Goodyear to build two Zeppelins in the United States. The partnership continued even when Zeppelin was under Nazi control and only ended after World War II began.

Expansion 1926–1970

On August 5, 1927, Goodyear had its initial public offering and was listed on the New York Stock Exchange.

By 1930, Goodyear had pioneered what would later become known as "tundra tires" for smaller aircraft—their so-called low inflation pressure "airwheel" aviation wheel-rim/tire sets were initially available in sizes up to 46 inches (117 cm) in diameter.

Over the next few decades, Goodyear grew to become a multinational corporation. It acquired their rival Kelly-Springfield Tire in 1935. During World War II Goodyear manufactured F4U Corsair fighter planes for the U.S. Military. Goodyear ranked 30th among United States corporations in the value of wartime production contracts. WWII forced the dissolution of the Goodyear-Zeppelin partnership in December 1940. By 1956 they owned and operated a nuclear processing plant in Ohio.

In 1944, Goodyear created a subsidiary in Mexico in a joint venture with Compañía Hulera, S.A. de C.V., Compañía Hulera Goodyear-Oxo, S.A. de C.V. or Goodyear-Oxo.

Radial tire transition
Goodyear is the only one of the five biggest tire firms among US tire manufacturers in 1970 to remain independent into the 21st century. Goodyear's success was partly due to the challenge posed by radial tire technology, and the varied responses. At the time, the entire US tire industry produced the older bias-ply technology. Estimates to fit factories with new machinery and tools for making the new product were between $600 million and $900 million. This was a substantial amount in a low margin business with sales revenue in the low billions. The US market was slowly shifting towards the radial tire, as had already been the case in Europe and Asia. In 1968, Consumer Reports, an influential American magazine, acknowledged the superiority of radial construction, which had been developed in 1946 by Michelin.

When Charles J. Pilliod Jr. became CEO in 1974, he faced a major investment decision regarding the radial tire, which today has a market share of nearly 100%. Despite heavy criticism at the time, Pilliod invested heavily in new factories and tooling to build the radial tire. Sam Gibara, who headed Goodyear from 1996 to 2003, has noted that without the action of Pilliod, Goodyear "wouldn't be around today."

Sales for 1969 topped $3 billion. Five years later sales topped $5 billion and Goodyear operated in 34 countries. In 1978, the original Akron plant was converted into a Technical Center for research and design. By 1985, worldwide sales exceeded $10 billion.

Goodyear Aerospace, a holding that developed from the Goodyear Aircraft Company after World War II, designed a supercomputer for NASA's Goddard Spaceflight Center in 1979, the MPP. The subsidiary was sold in 1987 to the Loral Corporation as a result of restructuring.

In 1987, Goodyear formed a business partnership with Canadian tire retailer Fountain Tire.

Diversification and Goldsmith affair 1986 
In the 1980s, incoming Goodyear CEO Robert E. Mercer argued that the tire and automobile-related businesses that formed the core of Goodyear to that date were slow growing and a handicap. He set a strategy "to get away from the cyclical nature of the automobile business through mergers or purchase of businesses unrelated to tires or vehicles."

In 1983, Goodyear acquired the natural gas company Celeron Corporation in exchange for stock valued at more than $740 million. It went on to invest heavily in gas exploration including the 1,200 mile crude oil "All American" pipeline from California to Texas. The project was initially estimated to cost $600 million but ultimately cost almost $1 billion.

In October 1986 British financier James Goldsmith in conjunction with the investment group Hanson purchased 11.5% of Goodyear's outstanding common stock. This was viewed as a greenmail attack by some, and as shareholder activism by Goldsmith, who viewed the company's move into areas far removed from tire development production and sale as commercially ill-advised and wanted the company to divest, especially, its oil interests which he viewed as depressing the value of the company.

On November 20, 1986, Goodyear acquired all of the stock held by Goldsmith's group (12,549,400 shares) at an above-market price of $49.50 per share. Goodyear also made a tender offer for up to 40 million shares of its stock from other shareholders at $50 per share. The tender offer resulted in Goodyear buying 40,435,764 shares of stock in February 1987.

As a result of the stock buyback, Goodyear took a charge of $224.6 million associated with a massive restructuring plan. It sold its Goodyear Aerospace business to Loral Corporation for $588 million and its motor wheel business to Lemmerz Inc. for $175 million. Two subsidiaries involved in agricultural products, real estate development, and a resort hotel in Arizona were sold for $220.1 million. The company also sold the Celeron gas and oil corporation. In 1998, the All American Pipeline, Celeron Gathering, and Celeron Trading and Transportation were sold, largely completing what Goldsmith's hostile takeover had suggested good management should do. In the years following 1987, the company invested in its tire business. President Tom Barrett succeeded Chairman Robert Mercer in 1989, and began a process of modernizing and expanding Goodyear plants in cities like Lawton, Oklahoma, Napanee, Canada, Point Pleasant, West Virginia, and Scottsboro, Alabama. In the 2000s, the move of business into low-wage countries, facilitated by GATT (which Goldsmith had warned government against, calling it "a policy to impoverish"), resulted in plants across North America being shuttered, for instance Cumberland, Maryland; New Toronto, Ontario, Canada, and Windsor, Vermont were closed.

1990 to present

The last major restructuring of the company took place in 1991. Goodyear hired Stanley Gault, former CEO of Rubbermaid, to expand the company into new markets. The moves resulted in 12,000 employees being laid off.

In 2005, Titan Tire purchased the farm tire business of Goodyear, and manufactures Goodyear agricultural tires under license. This acquisition included the plant in Freeport, Illinois.

In the summer of 2009, the company announced it would close its tire plant in the Philippines as part of a strategy to address uncompetitive manufacturing capacity globally by the end of the third quarter of that year.

Goodyear announced plans to sell the assets of its Latin American off-road tire business to Titan Tire for $98.6 million, including the plant in Sao Paulo, Brazil and a licensing agreement that allows Titan to continue manufacturing under the Goodyear brand. This deal is similar to Titan's 2005 purchase of Goodyear's US farm tire assets.

In 2011, more than 70 years after the dissolution of the Goodyear-Zeppelin Corporation, it is announced that Goodyear will partner with Zeppelin again (the legacy company Zeppelin Luftschifftechnik) to build more zeppelins together.

In 2018, Goodyear and Bridgestone announced the creation of TireHub, a joint wholesale distribution network across the United States. At the same time, Goodyear also announced that it was ending its distribution relationship with American Tire Distributors, which used to be the largest tire wholesaler in the US.

In 2018, Goodyear was ordered to pay $40.1 million to J. Walter Twidwell, who claimed he developed mesothelioma because of exposure to asbestos. After the trial, Goodyear asked the New York Supreme Court for a new trial. Goodyear attorney James Lynch said Goodyear did not receive proper consideration from the jury. Lynch said that the other side's attorneys engaged in character assassinations against expert witnesses. During closing remarks, the attorneys for Twidwell put up a slide with the heads of Goodyear's expert witnesses pasted onto "insulting caricatures."

In December 2018, Goodyear ceased operations in Venezuela due a lack of materials and rising costs resulting from hyperinflation.

In February 2021, Goodyear announced that it will acquire the Cooper Tire & Rubber Company for $2.5 billion. The transaction is expected to close in the second half of 2021.

Timeline

Source:

 1898: Goodyear founded
 1899: Automobile tires added to the original product line of bicycle tires, carriage tires and horseshoe pads
 1901: Seiberling makes racing tires for Henry Ford
 1903: Paul Litchfield granted patent on first tubeless automobile tire (Litchfield would go on to become president of Goodyear-Zeppelin, then board chairman)
 1908: Ford's Model T is outfitted with Goodyear tires
 1909: First pneumatic aircraft tire
 1911: First airship envelope
 1912: Goodyear blimp first debuts
 1917: Made airships and balloons for the U.S. military during World War I
 1919: Tires on the winning car at the Indianapolis 500
 1924: Zeppelin patents acquired, joint venture Goodyear-Zeppelin Corporation formed with the German company
 1925: Pilgrim is launched, the first commercial non-rigid airship to use helium
 1926: World's largest rubber company, based on sales of $230,161,356
 1927: Initial public offering
 1929: Construction of world's largest airship dock started in Akron
 1929: Introduction of first-known example of low-pressure tundra tires for aviation, invented by Alvin J. Musselman as Goodyear "Airwheels"
 1935: Acquired Kelly-Springfield Tire
 1937: First American-made synthetic rubber tire
 1940: In December, Goodyear-Zeppelin Corporation dissolved with WWII straining partnership
 1942: Awarded contract to build FG-series Corsair naval fighter planes
 1944: Tire testing begins near San Angelo, Texas
 1947: First nylon tires developed
 1949: First television advertising with sponsorship of "The Goodyear Review," hosted by Paul Whiteman
 1954: First nationwide strike in company's history lasted 52 days
 1956: Goodyear-operated U235 atomic processing plant opens in Ohio
 1957: Goodyear Proving Grounds for tire testing, near San Angelo, Texas, is rebuilt
 1958: Production of foam-padded instrument panels begun for 1959 model cars
 1962: Goodyear racing tires used on more winning stock and sports cars than any other brand
 1963: Goodyear produces its one billionth tire
 1965: Radial-ply tires made available in a full range of sizes to auto manufacturers
 1967: Goodyear introduces the Polyglas tire, one of the first wide-tread bias-belted fiberglass tires, which along with similar tires from competitors such as the Firestone Wide-Oval would become regular equipment on 1970 to 1974 models, which would be superseded by radial tires beginning in 1975.
 1969: Sales reach $3 billion
 1970: First tires on the moon (Apollo 14)
 1974: Sales reach $5 billion
 1975: All tires used in Indianapolis 500 supplied by Goodyear
 1976: Chemical Division shipped first shatterproof polyester resin bottles
 1977: Industry's first all-season tire (Tiempo) introduced
 1978: Akron plant converted into Technical Center for R&D
 1983: Three billionth tire produced
 1984: Worldwide sales exceed $10 billion
 1986: James Goldsmith takeover attempt and resulting restructuring
 1987: Completion of the California - Texas "All American" oil pipeline
 1991: Aquatred tire introduced
 1992: Began selling tires at Sears stores
 1993: Opened first tire store in Beijing, China
 1993: Inauguration of Dalian plant, China
 1994: "electronic store" opened on CompuServe
 1995: Worldwide sales exceed $13 billion
 1995: Bought Polish Tire Company Dębica 
 1998: Sold the All American Pipeline and Celeron businesses
 1999: Announced $1 billion global alliance with Japan's Sumitomo Rubber Industries, which had rights to the Dunlop Tyres brand in much of the world, to establish six joint ventures in North America, Europe and Japan
 2000: Formed an Internet-based purchasing alliance with five other rubber companies called RubberNetwork.com
 2003: Quarterly dividend to shareholders eliminated
 2004: Assurance TripleTred and ComforTred tires introduced
 2005: North American farm tire operations sold to Titan Tire Corporation
 2006: Goodyear blimp made maiden voyage in China
 2007: Engineered Products Division sold to Carlyle Group; EPD is renamed Veyance Technologies
 2008: Voluntary Employees' Beneficiary Association trust (VEBA) approved by U.S. District Court, funded with $1 billion
 2009: Goodyear Assurance Fuel Max tire introduced in North America
 2010: Plans announced to sell European and Latin American farm tire businesses
 2011: After being dissolved during WWII, Goodyear and Zeppelin's legacy company partner again to build more airships together
 2013: New headquarters complex opens in Akron
 2015: Goodyear and Sumitomo announced that they would dissolve their worldwide partnership.
 2018: The company ranked 187th on the Fortune 500 list of the largest United States companies by revenue marking its 24th year on the list
 2020: The company unveiled a self-regenerating concept tire with artificial intelligence features that allow the tire treads to change according to the environment and climate. The technology also uses sensors to learn from driver behavior. Information is sent to Goodyear's cloud servers where it is processed to build drivers' profiles, allowing predictions to be made based on drivers' data.

Corporate structure and leadership

Board of directors  

James A. Firestone.
Werner Geissler.
Peter S. Hellman.
Richard J. Kramer.
W. Alan McCollough.
John E. McGlade.
Roderick A. Palmore.
Stephanie Streeter. 
Thomas H. Weidemeyer. 
Michael R. Wessel.
Laurette T. Koellner
Thomas L. Williams 

Former Board members include Shirley D. Peterson, William J. Contay, James C. Boland and Rodney O'Neal. Richard Kramer is the chief executive officer and president of the company (since 2010), succeeding Robert J. Keegan.

Subsidiaries
Cooper Tire & Rubber Co.
Dunlop Tyres (North America, Europe, Australia and New Zealand)
The Kelly Springfield Tire Company (United States)
Douglas Tires
Fierce
Lee
Sava (Slovenia)
Fulda (Germany)
Dębica (Poland)
Wingfoot Commercial Tire Systems, LLC
Bluestreak (Indonesia)
Regetta (Australia) Distributed by KMART
LS2000 (Japan) Distributed by Goodyear Autocare
Goodyear Auto Service Centers
Goodyear Chemical
Just Tires

Controversies

Foreign relations with Indonesia in the 1960s

Following the military coup in Indonesia in 1965, the Indonesian president Suharto encouraged Goodyear to return and offered rubber resources and political prisoners as labor. In an NBC special aired in 1967, reporter Ted Yates aired footage showing former Communist rubber union workers escorted at gunpoint to the rubber plantation.

Bad as things are in Indonesia, one positive fact is known. Indonesia has a fabulous potential wealth in natural resources and the New Order [the fascist regime headed by pro-U.S. General Suharto] wants it exploited. So they are returning the private properties expropriated by Sukarno's regime. Goodyear's Sumatran rubber empire is an example. It was seized [by the rubber workers] in retaliation for U.S. aggression in Vietnam in 1965. The rubber workers union was Communist-run, so after the coup many of them were killed or imprisoned. Some of the survivors, you see them here, still work the rubber – but this time as prisoners, and at gunpoint.

Pay discrimination lawsuits

United States Supreme Court Justice Ruth Bader Ginsburg stated,

Lilly Ledbetter was a supervisor at Goodyear Tire and Rubber's plant in Gadsden, Alabama, from 1979 until her retirement in 1998. For most of those years, she worked as an area manager, a position largely occupied by men. Initially, Ledbetter's salary was in line with the salaries of men performing substantially similar work. Over time, however, her pay slipped in comparison to the pay of male area managers with equal or less seniority. By the end of 1997, Ledbetter was the only woman working as an area manager and the pay discrepancy between Ledbetter and her 15 male counterparts was stark: Ledbetter was paid $3,727 per month; the lowest paid male area manager received $4,286 per month, the highest paid, $5,236.

Lilly Ledbetter sued Goodyear claiming she was paid less than men doing the same work. She won the suit and was awarded $360,000, the jury deciding that Goodyear had clearly engaged in discrimination. The case was appealed to the Supreme Court. In Ledbetter v. Goodyear Tire & Rubber Co., 550 U.S. ___ (2007), Justice Alito held for the five-justice majority that employers are protected from lawsuits over race or gender pay discrimination if the claims are based on decisions made by the employer 180 days ago or more. The United States Congress overturned this decision by passing the Lilly Ledbetter Fair Pay Act of 2009 which was the first bill signed into law by President Obama.

This was a case of statutory rather than constitutional interpretation. The plaintiff in this case, Lilly Ledbetter, characterized her situation as one where "disparate pay is received during the statutory limitations period, but is the result of intentionally discriminatory pay decisions that occurred outside the limitations period." In rejecting Ledbetter's appeal, the Supreme Court said that "she could have, and should have, sued" when the pay decisions were made, instead of waiting beyond the 180-day statutory charging period.

Justice Ginsburg dissented from the opinion of the Court, joined by Justices Stevens, Souter, and Breyer. She argued against applying the 180-day limit to pay discrimination, because discrimination often occurs in small increments over large periods of time. Furthermore, the pay information of fellow workers is typically confidential and unavailable for comparison. Ginsburg argued that pay discrimination is inherently different from adverse actions, such as termination. Adverse actions are obvious, but small pay discrepancy is often difficult to recognize until more than 180 days of the pay change. Ginsburg argued that the broad remedial purpose of the statute was incompatible with the Court's "cramped" interpretation. Her dissent asserted that the employer had been, "Knowingly carrying past pay discrimination forward" during the 180-day charging period, and therefore could be held liable.

Environmental record
Researchers at the University of Massachusetts Amherst identified Goodyear as the 19th-largest corporate producer of air pollution in the United States, with roughly 4.16 million lbs of toxins released into the air annually. Major pollutants included sulfuric acid, cobalt compounds, and chlorine. The Center for Public Integrity reports that Goodyear has been named as a potentially responsible party in at least 54 of the nation's Superfund toxic waste sites.
On February 8, 2008, Goodyear announced the launch of an environmentally friendly tire produced using a cornstarch-based material. The Goodyear Eagle LS2000 partially replaces the traditional carbon black and silica with filler materials derived from corn starch thanks to "BioTRED compounding technology". The new technology increases the tires "flexibility and resistance to energy loss", which extend the tires life-span and lessen the impact on the environment. Similarly, Goodyear announced on April 22, 2008, that it had joined the U.S. Environmental Protection Agency's SmartWay Transport Partnership. The transport partnership is an attempt between the truck transportation industry and the EPA to reduce air pollution and greenhouse emissions as well as increase energy efficiency. The SmartWay partnership's tractors and trailers will use Goodyear's Fuel Max linehaul tires that increase fuel efficiency while reducing emissions. According to Goodyear and EPA officials "the fuel-efficient line-haul tires deliver up to 4% improved truck fuel economy, and when used with other SmartWay-qualified components, each 18- wheel tractor and trailer used in long-haul can produce savings of up to 4,000 gallons per year, or more than $11,000 annually."

Foreign Corrupt Practices Act charges

On February 24, 2015, Goodyear agreed to pay more than $16 million to settle Foreign Corrupt Practices Act "FCPA" charges that two of its African subsidiaries allegedly paid $3.2 million in bribes that generated $14,122,535 in illicit profits. The U.S. Securities and Exchange Commission "SEC" FCPA charges involved Goodyear subsidiaries in Kenya and Angola for allegedly paying bribes to government and private-sector workers in exchange for sales in each country. According to the SEC because "Goodyear did not prevent or detect these improper payments because it failed to implement adequate FCPA compliance controls at its subsidiaries" and, for the Kenyan subsidiary, "because it failed to conduct adequate due diligence" prior to its acquisition. It was not alleged that Goodyear had any involvement with or knowledge of its subsidiaries' improper conduct.

Internal training and discrimination

On August 18, 2020, WIBW, a local CBS-affiliate television station, reported that an internal PowerPoint slide on political attire from a Topeka, Kansas, training seminar was circulating on social media. The leaked slide depicted a "zero tolerance" policy towards some political movements. President Donald Trump called for a boycott of Goodyear tires the following day, as Trump campaign attire such as MAGA hats were among the banned products. Goodyear responded via Twitter, stating "the visual in question was not created or distributed by Goodyear corporate, nor was it part of a diversity training class". Following release of the audio that went with the slide, Goodyear admitted the slide was used at its Topeka factory.

Goodyear products

Automotive

Assurance (Passenger All Season)
TripleTred All Season
Triplemax
ComforTred Touring
FuelMax
CS Fuel Max (SUV)
CS TripleTred All Season (SUV)
Weather Ready
Outlast (Exclusively sold at Walmart Auto Care Centers)
Integrity (OE All Season)
Fortera (SUV)
Silent Armor
TripleTread
HL
SL
Wrangler (truck)
Silent Armor
All Terrain Adventure
AT/R
AT/S
AT/SA
RS/A
RT/S
SR-A
TG
HP
HP AW
MTR with Kevlar
DuraTrac
DuraGrip
Radial (235/75R15 only)
 EfficientGrip (Summer Tires)
EfficientGrip Performance
EfficientGrip Compact
Eagle (Touring/Performance/OE)
Eagle F1
Eagle F1 Asymmetric SUV
Eagle F1 Supercar
Eagle F1 GS-D3
Eagle F1 Directional 5
Eagle F1 Asymmetric
Eagle F1 Asymmetric 2
Eagle F1 Asymmetric 3
Eagle F1 Asymmetric 5
Eagle F1 Asymmetric 6
Eagle Efficient Grip
Eagle Efficient Grip Performance
Eagle GT3
Eagle LS
Eagle LS2
Eagle NCT
Eagle RS-A
Eagle RS-A 2
Eagle RV
Eagle Sport
Excellence
Response Edge
Carbon Fiber Technology
Nordic (Winter tires)
UltraGrip Ice (Winter tires)
UltraGrip Ice WRT (Winter tires)
UltraGrip Winter (Winter tires)
Winter Command (Winter tires)
KhADI-27

Commercial

Commercial Truck
Cargo G26
Cargo Marathon
Cargo Marathon 2
Cargo Vector
Cargo Vector 2
Fuel Max
Duraseal
Off The Road Tires
Articulated Dump Truck
Rigid Haulage Truck
Mobile Crane
Scaper
Port & Container Handling
Dozer and Loader
Mine Service
Motor Grader
ATV Tires
Rawhide Camo
Rawhide MT/R
RV Tires
Unisteel series (G670RV, G149RSA, G169RSA, G647RSS, G614RST)
Wrangler HT (all weather)
Marathon (trailer towing)
Aviation

Non-tire industrial 

 Airsprings (licensed to Infinity Engineered Products)
 Industrial hose
 Hydraulic products
 Conveyor belt products
 Power transmission products
 Molded transportation products (vibration control)
 Rubber Track
 Isoprene monomer
 Synthetic rubber for medical applications
 Synthetic rubber for chewing gum

Veyance Technologies was purchased by ContiTech and no longer has the rights to Goodyear's licenses.

Goodyear-branded wiper blades are made under license by Saver Automotive, in Ohio. The wipers were never under the Veyance umbrella.

Goodyear also produces the rubber for  Lacoste tennis shoes, the AG-LT 21 and AG-LT 21 Ultra.

Manufacturing and development facilities

See also

 List of tire companies
 NASCAR Canadian Tire Series

References

Further reading
 Richard Korman. The Goodyear Story: An Inventor's Obsession and the Struggle for a Rubber Monopoly (2002)
 Ronald P. Conlin; "Goodyear Advertising Research: Past, Present and Future" Journal of Advertising Research, Vol. 34, 1994. The real story of Goodyear.

External links

 

 
1898 establishments in Ohio
1920s initial public offerings
American brands
Automotive companies established in 1898
Automotive companies of the United States
Companies based in Akron, Ohio
Companies based in Wolverhampton
Companies listed on the Nasdaq
Cycle parts manufacturers
Former components of the Dow Jones Industrial Average
Formula One tyre suppliers
Manufacturing companies based in Ohio
Multinational companies headquartered in the United States
Tire manufacturers of the United States
U.S. Synthetic Rubber Program